Pachanga is the seventh full-length studio album by Argentine pop singer King África. The album was released in Spain, Argentina and the US in 2001 through Vale Music. It includes the songs "Se mueve" and the original mix of "Salta" from the album "El Africano" (1993).

Track listing

Certifications

Awards 

This album was nominated by Billboard magazine as "Album of the Year" as Pachanga reached the top 10 selling album. Billboard also nominated King África as "Best Pop Artist revelation to Billboard Latin Awards" that same year. In Spain, Pachanga achieved the "Disco de Oro", an award for top selling artists.

References

2001 albums
King África albums